Commissioner v. Sunnen, 333 U.S. 591 (1948), was a case decided by the Supreme Court of the United States in 1948 in which the Court outlined the scope of collateral estoppel or estoppel by judgment in determinations of federal tax liability. This was important because a single controversial circumstance may have a bearing on income tax liability for several years. Res judicata, as part of the doctrine of judicial finality, protects a taxpayer's tax liability for a given year once the taxpayer wins a judgment in court. The judgment is controlling not only controlling with regard to the issues litigated but also with any issues that could have been raised if they would have affected the determination of tax liability for the year. However, of course, a single controversial circumstance may have a bearing on income tax liability for several years, and if a judgment fixes liability for one of the years, res judiciary forecloses the reopening of only that year's liability. But the related doctrine of collateral estoppel prevents relitigation of issues that were in fact raised and decided in the earlier litigation, even when they arise in a new cause of action, such as a dispute as to liability for a later year.

However, the Supreme Court said that collateral estoppel in determinations of tax liability "must be confined to situations where the matter raised in the second suit is identical in all respects with that decided in the first proceeding and where the controlling facts and applicable legal rules remain unchanged."

See also
Privity (law)
List of United States Supreme Court cases, volume 333

References

External links

Goldstein, "Res judicata and collateral estoppel," 54 A.B.A.J. 1131 (1968)

United States Supreme Court cases
1948 in United States case law
United States taxation and revenue case law
United States Supreme Court cases of the Vinson Court